Arthur Sanders may refer to:

 Arthur Sanders (footballer) (1901–1983), English footballer and teacher
 Arthur Sanders (RAF officer) (1898–1974), Royal Air Force air marshal
 Arthur Sanders (cricketer) (1900–1920), English cricketer

See also
Arthur Sandes (1793-1832), Irishman who fought in the Venezuelan war of Independence